Gasteria vlokii, the Swartberg gasteria, is a succulent plant, native to only a few widely separated spots in the Swartberg mountains of the southern Cape, South Africa.

Description

It is most closely related to the species Gasteria glauca, Gasteria ellaphieae and Gasteria nitida.  The flowers of all four species are also almost identical.

However it can be distinguished by its smooth, triangular (usually recurved), strap shaped leaves.

References

Flora of the Cape Provinces
vlokii